R. Joseph "Joe" Quinn (born August 22, 1942) was an American politician and lawyer.

Quinn lived was born in Minnesota and lived in Blaine, Minnesota and Coon Rapids, Minnesota with his wife and family. He received his bachelor's degree in English from College of Saint Benedict and Saint John's University and his Juris Doctor degree from  Hamline University School of Law. Quinn was admitted to the Minnesota bar. Quinn served in the Minnesota House of Representatives from 1983 to 1991 and was a Democrat. Quinn then served as Minnesota District Court judge.

References

-

1942 births
Living people
People from Blaine, Minnesota
People from Coon Rapids, Minnesota
College of Saint Benedict and Saint John's University alumni
Hamline University School of Law alumni
Minnesota lawyers
Minnesota state court judges
Democratic Party members of the Minnesota House of Representatives